The following lists events that happened in 2014 in El Salvador.

Incumbents
President: Mauricio Funes (until 1 June), Salvador Sánchez Cerén (starting 1 June)
Vice President: Salvador Sánchez Cerén (until 1 June), Óscar Ortiz (starting 1 June)

Events

January
 30 January – A man whose boat was adrift for sixteen months is rescued at the Marshall Islands. The journey began with a companion as part of a venture from Mexico for El Salvador in September 2012.

February
 2 February – Voters in El Salvador go to the polls with a tight race expected.

June
 1 June – Former Farabundo Martí National Liberation Front guerrilla leader Salvador Sánchez Cerén is sworn in as the President of El Salvador.

October
 13 October – A 7.4 magnitude earthquake occurs off the coast of El Salvador with a tsunami warning issued for the Pacific Ocean coasts of El Salvador, Nicaragua and Honduras.

References

 
El Salvador
2010s in El Salvador
Years of the 21st century in El Salvador
El Salvador